Kerry Brown (born June 19, 1985 in Marietta, Georgia) is a former American football Offensive Lineman and left guard. He last played for the Washington Redskins of the National Football League. He was signed by the Redskins as an undrafted free agent in 2008. He played college football at Appalachian State and was inducted into the Appalachian State University Hall of Fame in 2016.

Early years
Brown attended and played high school football at Lassiter High School in Marietta, Georgia.

College career
Brown played college football at Appalachian State University, and was redshirted his first year. After making appearances in eight games during his second year, Brown was named first-team all-Southern Conference by the coaches and second-team by the league’s media. He led the Mountaineers with 84 knockdowns and ranked second with five pins despite sharing time at right guard with Kyle Knox. In 2006, Brown became Appalachian’s second-straight Jacobs Blocking Trophy recipient.  Brown led the team with 106 knockdowns. Brown started 31-consecutive games at left guard. His accomplishments on the field earned him nomination and award to the Appalachian State University Hall of Fame class of 2016 along with former team mate Julian Rauch.

References

External links
Washington Redskins bio

1985 births
Living people
Sportspeople from Marietta, Georgia
Players of American football from Marietta, Georgia
American football offensive guards
Appalachian State Mountaineers football players
Washington Redskins players